Raphitoma zelotypa is a species of sea snail, a marine gastropod mollusk in the family Raphitomidae.

Description
The length of the shell varies between 8 mm and 9 mm.

Distribution
This marine species occurs off Angola.

References

External links
 Rolán E., Otero-Schmitt J. & Fernandes F. (1998) The family Turridae s. l. (Mollusca, Neogastropoda) in Angola (West Africa). 1. Subfamily Daphnellinae. Iberus, 16: 95–118
 MNHN, Paris: holotype
 

Endemic fauna of Angola
zelotypa
Gastropods described in 1998